Probable ATP-dependent RNA helicase DDX20, also known as DEAD-box helicase 20 and gem-associated protein 3 (GEMIN3), is an enzyme that in humans is encoded by the DDX20 gene.

Function 

DEAD box proteins, characterized by the conserved motif Asp-Glu-Ala-Asp (DEAD), are putative RNA helicases. They are implicated in a number of cellular processes involving alteration of RNA secondary structure such as translation initiation, nuclear and mitochondrial splicing, and ribosome and spliceosome assembly. Based on their distribution patterns, some members of this family are believed to be involved in embryogenesis, spermatogenesis, and cellular growth and division. This gene encodes a DEAD box protein, which has an ATPase activity and is a component of the survival of motor neuron (SMN) complex. 
SMN is the spinal muscular atrophy gene product, and may play a catalytic role in the function of the SMN complex on RNPs.

Clinical significance 
Previous research has revealed that DDX20 may act as a tumor suppressor in hepatocellular carcinoma and as a tumor promoter in breast cancer. DDX20 deficiency enhances NF-κB activity by impairing the NF-κB-suppressive action of microRNAs, and suggest that dysregulation of the microRNA machinery components may also be involved in pathogenesis in various human diseases. Such as miRNA-140 which acts as a liver tumor suppressor, and due to a deficiency of DDX20, miRNA-140 function gets impair, this subsequent functional impairment of miRNAs could lead to hepatocarcinogenesis. Similarly, DDX20 may promote the progression of Prostate cancer (PCa) through the NF-κB pathway. In a clinical based study it has been observed that positive DP103/NF-κB feedback loop promotes constitutive NF-κB activation in invasive breast cancers and activation of this pathway is linked to cancer progression and the acquisition of chemotherapy resistance. It makes DP103 has potential as a therapeutic target for breast cancer treatment.

Interactions 

DDX20 has been shown to interact with:

 EIF2C2, 
 GEMIN4, 
 GEMIN5, 
 LSM2, 
 SMN1, 
 SNRPB, 
 SNRPD3 and 
 SNRPG, 
 SNRPD1, 
 SNRPD2, 
 SNRPE,
 SNRPF,  and
 SIP1.

References

Further reading